Best of Buck Owens, Vol. 2 is a compilation album by Buck Owens, released in 1968.

The album peaked at #5 on the Billboard Top Country Albums chart.

Capitol deleted the album after Owens departed the label for Warner Brothers Records, in 1977.

Critical reception
AllMusic called the album "a must for any serious country & western fan."

Track listing
All songs by Buck Owens unless otherwise noted.

Side one
 "I've Got a Tiger by the Tail" (Harlan Howard, Owens)
 "Together Again"
 "Act Naturally" (Johnny Russell, Voni Morrison)
 "Before You Go" (Owens, Don Rich)
 "Waitin' in Your Welfare Line" (Owens, Rich, Nat Stuckey)
 "My Heart Skips a Beat"

Side two
 "Open Up Your Heart"
 "Think of Me" (Estelle Olson, Rich)
 "Buckaroo" (Bob Morris)
 "I Don't Care (Just as Long as You Love Me)"
 "Only You (Can Break My Heart)"
 "Love's Gonna Live Here"

Personnel
 Harlan Howard - composer
 Bob Morris - composer
 Voni Morrison - composer
 Estella Olson - composer
 Buck Owens - composer, guitar, primary artist, vocals
 Buck Ram - composer
 Ande Rand - composer
 Don Rich - composer
 Johnny Russell - composer
 Nat Stuckey - composer

References

Buck Owens albums
1968 greatest hits albums
Capitol Records compilation albums
Albums produced by Ken Nelson (United States record producer)